Dwarf thistle is a common name for several plants and may refer to:

Cirsium acaule, native to Europe
Cirsium drummondii, native to Canada and the northern United States
Cirsium scariosum, native to western North America

See also
Carlina acaulis, dwarf carline thistle